The 2011–12 Cal State Fullerton Titans men's basketball team represented California State University, Fullerton during the 2011–12 NCAA Division I men's basketball season. The Titans, led by ninth year head coach Bob Burton, played their home games at Titan Gym and are members of the Big West Conference. They finished the season 21–10, 12–4 in Big West play to finish in a tie for second place. They lost in the quarterfinals of the Big West Basketball tournament to UC Irvine. They were invited to the 2012 CollegeInsider.com Tournament where they lost in the first round to Loyola Marymount.

Following the season, head coach Bob Burton was fired after posting a record of 155–122 in nine seasons.

Roster

Schedule

|-
!colspan=9| Exhibition

|-
!colspan=9| Regular season

|-
!colspan=9| 2012 Big West Conference men's basketball tournament

|-
!colspan=9| 2012 CIT

References

Cal State Fullerton Titans men's basketball seasons
Cal State Fullerton
Cal State Fullerton
Fullerton Titans
Fullerton Titans